Catherine C. Morse (born June 15, 1955) is an American professional golfer who played on the LPGA Tour.

Morse was born in Rochester, New York. She won the 1972 New York State Junior Amateur, and the New York State Women's Amateur in 1974 and 1976. She was runner-up to Nancy Lopez in the 1972 U.S. Girls' Junior.

Morse played college golf at the University of Miami. In 1977, she won the AIAW national individual intercollegiate golf championship and led her team to the team title. She was inducted into the university's Sports Hall of Fame in 2009.

Morse joined the LPGA Tour in 1978 and won just once, at the 1982 Chrysler-Plymouth Charity Classic. She dedicated the win to her late fiancé, Jim Meyer, who died four months earlier.

Professional wins

LPGA Tour wins (1)

References

External links

American female golfers
Miami Hurricanes women's golfers
LPGA Tour golfers
Golfers from New York (state)
Golfers from Florida
Sportspeople from Rochester, New York
People from Palm Beach Gardens, Florida
1955 births
Living people